The nuclear receptor 4A2 (NR4A2) (nuclear receptor subfamily 4 group A member 2) also known as nuclear receptor related 1 protein (NURR1) is a protein that in humans is encoded by the NR4A2 gene. NR4A2 is a member of the nuclear receptor family of intracellular transcription factors.

NR4A2 plays a key role in the maintenance of the dopaminergic system of the brain. Mutations in this gene have been associated with disorders related to dopaminergic dysfunction, including Parkinson's disease and schizophrenia. Misregulation of this gene may be associated with rheumatoid arthritis. Four transcript variants encoding four distinct isoforms have been identified for this gene. Additional alternate splice variants may exist, but their full-length nature has not been determined.

This protein is thought to be critical to development of the dopamine phenotype in the midbrain, as mice without NR4A2 are lacking expression of this phenotype.  This is further confirmed by studies showing that when forcing NR4A2 expression in naïve precursor cells, there is complete dopamine phenotype gene expression.

While NR4A2 is a key protein, there are other factors required as research shows that solely expressing NR4A2 fails to stimulate this phenotypic gene expression. One of these suggested factors is winged-helix transcription factor 2 (Foxa2). Studies have found these two factors to be within the same region of developing dopaminergic neurons, both of these factors were present in order to have expression for the dopamine phenotype.

NR4A2 and Developmental Disorders
Mutations in NR4A2 have been associated with various developmental disorders, including Parkinson disease, schizophrenia, manic depression, and autism. De novo deletions that affect NR4A2 have been identified in some individuals with intellectual disability and language impairment, some of whom meet DSM-5 criteria for an autism diagnosis.

NR4A2 and Inflammation
Research has been conducted on NR4A2’s role in inflammation, and may provide important information in treating disorders caused by dopaminergic neuron disease. Inflammation in the CNS can result from activated microglia (macrophage analogs for the central nervous system) and other pro-inflammatory factors, such as bacterial lipopolysaccharide (LPS).  LPS binds to toll-like receptors (TLR), which induces inflammatory gene expression by promoting signal-dependent transcription factors. To determine which cells are dopaminergic, experiments measured the enzyme tyrosine hydroxylase (TH), which is needed for dopamine synthesis.  It has been shown that NR4A2 protects dopaminergic neurons from LPS-induced inflammation, by reducing inflammatory gene expression in microglia and astrocytes. When a short hairpin for NR4A2 was expressed in microglia and astrocytes, these cells produced inflammatory mediators, such as TNFa, NO synthase and IL-1β, supporting the conclusion that reduced NR4A2 promotes inflammation and leads to cell death of dopaminergic neurons.  NR4A2 interacts with the transcription factor complex NF-κB-p65 on the inflammatory gene promoters.  However, NR4A2 is dependent on other factors to be able to participate in these interactions.  NR4A2 needs to be sumoylated and its co-regulating factor, glycogen synthase kinase 3, needs to be phosphorylated for these interactions to occur.  Sumolyated NR4A2 recruits CoREST, a complex made of several proteins that assembles chromatin-modifying enzymes.  The NR4A2/CoREST complex inhibits transcription of inflammatory genes.

Structure 
One investigation conducted research on the structure and found that NR4A2 does not contain a ligand-binding cavity but a patch filled with hydrophobic side chains. Non-polar amino acid residues of NR4A2’s co-regulators, SMRT and NCoR, bind to this hydrophobic patch. Analysis of tertiary structure has shown that the binding surface of the ligand-binding domain is located on the grooves of the 11th and 12th alpha helices. This study also found essential structural components of this hydrophobic patch, to be the three amino acids residues, F574, F592, L593; mutation of any these three inhibits LBD activity.

Applications
NR4A2 induces tyrosine hydroxylase (TH) expression, which eventually leads to differentiation into dopaminergic neurons.  NR4A2 has been demonstrated to induce differentiation in CNS precursor cells in vitro but they require additional factors to reach full maturity and dopaminergic differentiation. Therefore, NR4A2 modulation may be promising for generation of dopaminergic neurons for Parkinson’s disease research, yet implantation of these induced cells as therapy treatments, has had limited results.

Knockout Studies 
Studies have shown that heterozygous knockout mice for the NR4A2 gene demonstrate reduced dopamine release. Initially this was compensated for by a decrease in the rate of dopamine reuptake; however, over time this reuptake could not make up for the reduced amount of dopamine being released. Coupled with the loss of dopamine receptor neurons, this can result in the onset of symptoms for Parkinson’s Disease.

Interactions 

NR4A2 has been shown to interact with:
 Beta-catenin,
 Pituitary homeobox 3,
 Retinoic acid receptor alpha, and
 Retinoic acid receptor beta.

References

Further reading

External links 
 

Intracellular receptors
Transcription factors